Damien Adam (born 28 June 1989) is a French politician of Renaissance (RE) who has been serving as a member of the National Assembly since the 2017 elections, representing the 1st constituency of the department of Seine-Maritime.

Political career
In parliament, Adam serves as member of the Committee on Economic Affairs. In addition to his committee assignments, he is part of the parliamentary friendship groups with China and the Netherlands.

In 2021, Adam became one eight rapporteurs on climate change legislation introduced by the government of Prime Minister Jean Castex.

Political positions
In July 2019, Adam voted in favor of the French ratification of the European Union’s Comprehensive Economic and Trade Agreement (CETA) with Canada.

Other activities
 Conseil national de l’industrie, Member

See also
 2017 French legislative election

References

1989 births
Living people
Deputies of the 15th National Assembly of the French Fifth Republic
La République En Marche! politicians
Politicians from Orléans
Deputies of the 16th National Assembly of the French Fifth Republic